Henry Tanner may refer to:

 Henry Ossawa Tanner (1859–1937), African American artist 
 H. W. Lloyd Tanner (Henry William Lloyd Tanner, 1851–1915), British mathematician
 Henry Schenck Tanner (1786–1858), American cartographer
 Henry S. Tanner (doctor) (1831–1919), American doctor known for his 1880 great fast in New York
 Henry Ernest Tanner (1868–1940), English-born farmer and political figure in British Columbia
 Henry Tanner (architect) (1849–1935), British architect, President of the Concrete Society